The 2019 Prefontaine Classic was the 45th edition of the annual outdoor track and field meeting in Palo Alto, California, United States. Held on Sunday June 30, 2019 at Cobb Track and Angell Field, it was the seventh leg of the 2019 IAAF Diamond League – the highest level international track and field circuit. The meet took place away from the regular venue at Hayward Field in Eugene, Oregon, as the location was under renovation in preparation for the 2021 World Athletics Championships.

A total of six world leading performances of the year were established at the competition. On the men's side, Christian Coleman won the 100 metres in 9.81 seconds, Timothy Cheruiyot set a time of 3:50.49 to win the 1500 metres, Rai Benjamin won the 400 metres hurdles in 47.16 seconds, and Joshua Cheptegei won the non-Diamond League two miles in 8:07.54 minutes. On the women's side, Sifan Hassan gave the outstanding performance of the meet with a 3000 metres win in 8:18.49 minutes – which was also a European record and Diamond League record time. Beatrice Chepkoech was also a world-leader with 8:55.58 minutes in the 3000 metres steeplechase. Darlan Romani set a South American record of 22.61 m to win the men's shot put, which was also a Diamond League record.

Further to the above performances, meeting records were set in the women's 800 metres (Caster Semenya, 1:55.70 min) and high jump (Mariya Lasitskene, 2.04 m).

Results

Men

Women

Non-Diamond League results

Men

Women

References

Results
Prefontaine Classic - 6/30/2019. Diamond League. Retrieved 2019-08-17.

External links
Official Diamond League Prefontaine Classic website

2019
Prefontaine Classic
Prefontaine Classic
Prefontaine Classic